Burlingame is a neighborhood in San Diego, California, bordered by North Park to the north and east, and by South Park to the south, and is located within the boundaries of the Greater North Park Community Planning Area.

Burlingame is a historic district recognized by the City of San Diego for its Craftsman Bungalow, Tudor Revival, Mission Revival, Spanish Colonial Revival, Prairie School, Art Deco and California Ranch architectural styles as well as properties that are hybrids of several styles.

Gallery

References

Neighborhoods in San Diego
Historic districts in San Diego